Isaac Epps Ready (December 17, 1903 –March 2, 1987) was the first President of the North Carolina Community College System, serving from 1963 to 1970.

Ready obtained degrees from the University of South Carolina and New York University, working as a teacher and principal in several North and South Carolina school districts from 1925 until 1945, when he became superintendent of the Roanoke Rapids public schools. In 1958, he was appointed to lead a curriculum study for the N.C. State Board of Education, resulting in the 1963 Community College Act that established the community college system in North Carolina. Ready was a co-author of the act. Following his retirement, he was appointed a visiting professor (later, an emeritus professor) of adult and community college education at North Carolina State University.

References 

1903 births
1987 deaths
People from Johnston, South Carolina
University of South Carolina alumni
American educators
North Carolina State University faculty
Presidents of the North Carolina Community College System